The Körber European Science Prize is presented annually by the Körber Foundation in Hamburg honoring outstanding scientists working in Europe for their promising research projects. The prize is endowed with one million euro (until 2018: 750,000 euro) and promotes research projects in the life sciences and physical sciences.

History
The prize was initiated by the entrepreneur Kurt A. Körber with the help of Reimar Lüst, the president of the Max Planck Society. The first award was in 1985. At first, European research teams were honored, but since 2005, only individuals qualify.

Selection process
Candidates for the prize need not be from Europe, but they must be living in Europe. Renowned scientists from all over Europe, grouped into two Search Committees, select promising candidates. The awards are annual and alternate between the life and physical sciences. Those who are shortlisted are then asked to submit a detailed proposal for a research project which is then judged in two rounds of assessment by the Search Committee. The work of the Search Committee is supported by international experts. A maximum of five candidates are subsequently recommended to the Trustee Committee which, based on a summary of expert assessments, previous publications and scientific career history, decides on the new prizewinner. A personal application is not allowed.

Prize money
All prizewinners receive a certificate and one million euro (until 2008: 750,000 euros) prize money. The prizewinners can keep 10 percent of the money for themselves and must spend the rest on research in Europe in three to five years. Aside from these restrictions they alone can decide how to use the money.

Presentation
The prize is presented every year in the Great Hall of Hamburg City Hall in the presence of the Mayor of the Free and Hanseatic City of Hamburg and 600 guests from science, industry, politics, and society.

Winners
1985: Applications of Shock Waves in Medicine, Walter Brendel, Michael Delius, Georg Enders, Joseph Holl, Gustav Paumgartner, Tilman Sauerbruch
1985: Back Pressure Casting Technology, Teodor Balevski, Rumen Batschvarov, Emil Momtschilov, Dragan Nenov, Rangel Zvetkov
1986: Retrovirus Research (AIDS), Jean-Claude Gluckman, Sven Haahr, George Janossy, David Klatzmann, Luc Montagnier, Paul Rácz
1987: Further Development of Electron Holography, Karl-Heinz Herrmann, Friedrich Lenz, Hannes Lichte, Gottfried Möllenstedt
1987: Creating Ultralow Temperatures, Riitta Hari, Matti Krusius, Olli V. Lounasmaa, Martti Salomaa
1988: Extending the Hamburg Pyrolytic Technique to Destroy Toxic Wastes, Alfons Buekens, Vasilij Dragalov, Walter Kaminsky, Hansjörg Sinn
1989: Active Substances from Plant Cell Cultures, Christian Brunold, Yury Y. Gleba, Lutz Nover, J. David Phillipson, Elmar Weiler, Meinhart H. Zenk
1990: Forecasting Short-Term Changes in Climate, Lennart Bengtsson, Bert Bolin, Klaus Ferdinand Hasselmann
1991: Recognizing and Preventing Cancer Caused by Environmental Chemicals, Lars Ehrenberg, Dietrich Henschler, Werner Lutz, Hans-Günter Neumann
1992: The Spread and Transformation of Contaminants in Ground Water, Philippe Behra, Wolfgang Kinzelbach, Ludwig Luckner, René Schwarzenbach, Laura Sigg
1993: Bionics of Walking: The Technical Application of Biological Knowledge, Felix Chernousko, François Clarac, Holk Cruse, Friedrich Pfeiffer
1994: Modern Plant Breeding: From the Cell to the Plant, Dénes Dudits, Dirk Inzé, Anne Marie Lambert, Horst Lörz
1995: Genetic Probes in Environmental Research and Medicine, Rudolf Amann, Erik C. Böttger, Ulf B. Göbel, Bo Barker Jørgensen, Niels Peter Revsbech, Karl-Heinz Schleifer, Jiri Wanner
1996: The Habitat of Treetops in the Tropics, Pierre Charles-Dominique, Antoine Cleef, Gerhard Gottsberger, Bert Hölldobler, Karl E. Linsenmair, Ulrich Lüttge
1996: Computer-Assisted Design of Materials, Michael Ashby, Yves Bréchet, Michel Rappaz
1997: Mutant Mouse Models in Clinical Research, Pawel Kisielow, Klaus Rajewsky, Harald von Boehmer
1998: Magnetic resonance imaging with Helium-3, Werner Heil, Michèle Leduc, Ernst-Wilhelm Otten, Manfred Thelen
1998: Electronic Micronoses to Enhance Safety at the Workplace, Henry Baltes, Wolfgang Göpel, Massimo Rudan
1999: High-Altitude Platforms for Telecommunications, Bernd Kröplin, Per Lindstrand, John Adrian Pyle, Michael André Rehmet
2000: Perception of Shape in Technology with Insights from Nature, Rodney Douglas, Amiram Grinvald, Randolf Menzel, Wolf Singer, Christoph von der Malsburg
2001: Optimised Crops through Genetic Engineering, Wolf-Bernd Frommer, Rainer Hedrich, Enrico Martinoia, Dale Sanders, Norbert Sauer
2002: Scarfree Wound Healing Using Tissue Engineering, Mark W. J. Ferguson, Jeffrey A. Hubbell, Cay M. Kielty, Björn Stark, Michael G. Walker
2003: Light-driven Molecular Walkers, Ben Feringa, Martin Möller, Justin Molloy, Niek F. van Hulst
2004: Therapies for a New Group of Hereditary Diseases, Markus Aebi, Thierry Hennet, Jaak Jaeken, Ludwig Lehle, Gert Matthijs, Kurt von Figura
2005: Taking Light onto New Paths, Philip Russell
2006: Chaperons of the Protein Folding in Biotechnology and Medicine, Franz-Ulrich Hartl
2007: Automated Synthesis of Carbohydrate Vaccinations against Tropical Diseases, Peter Seeberger
2008: Drugs to Fight Cancer and Aging, Maria Blasco
2009: Graphene, the Thinnest Material in the Universe, Andre Geim
2010: Auxin – Understanding Plant Growth, Jiří Friml
2011: STED microscopy, Stefan Hell
2012: Ground-breaking work on the Proteome, Matthias Mann.
2013: Immanuel Bloch
2014: May-Britt Moser and Edvard Moser
2015: Multiferroics, Nicola Spaldin
2016: Hans Clevers
2017: , for he and his team developed the key technologies, including high-precision lasers, which LIGO were able to direct detected gravitational waves in 2015.
2018: Svante Pääbo, for his pioneering achievements in the field of paleogenetics.
2019: Bernhard Schölkopf, for developing mathematical methods that have made a significant contribution to helping artificial intelligence (AI) reach its most recent heights.
2020: Botond Roska, for revolutionising ophthalmology.
2021: Clare Grey, for optimisation of batteries using NMR spectroscopy.
2022: Anthony A. Hyman, for research on cell droplets

References

External links
Körber European Science Prize

Science and technology awards